Downshift or downshifting may refer to:

The shift of a vehicle transmission into a lower gear.
Downshift, the name of three fictional characters in the Transformers universes. 
Downshifting (lifestyle), the social practice of adopting a simpler life

See also 
 Down-shift operator, in mathematics